Malbazar subdivision is an administrative division of the Jalpaiguri district in the Indian state of West Bengal.

Geography

Subdivisions
Jalpaiguri district is divided into the following administrative subdivisions:

Administrative units
Malbazar subdivision has 3 police stations, 3 community development blocks, 3 panchayat samitis, 22 gram panchayats, 171 mouzas, 160 inhabited villages, 1 municipality and 6 census towns. The municipality is: Malbazar. The census towns are: Odlabari, Dakshin Odlabari, Lataguri, Matialihat, Chalsa Mahabari and Mangalbari. The subdivision has its headquarters at Malbazar.

Police stations
Police stations in the Malbazar subdivision have the following features and jurisdiction:

# Banarhat police station is in Jalpaiguri Sadar subdivision

Blocks
Community development blocks in the Malbazar subdivision are:

Gram Panchayats
The subdivision contains 22 gram panchayats under 4 community development blocks:

 Mal (community development block) consists of six gram panchayats, viz. Bagrakot, Damdim, Rangamati, Kumlai, Odlabari and Tesimala.
 Matiali (community development block) consists of five gram panchayats, viz. Bidhannagar, Matiali Hat, Matiali–Batabari–II, Indong–Matiali and Matiali–Batabari–I.
 Nagrakata (community development block) consists of five gram panchayats, viz. Angrabhasa–I, Champaguri, Sulkapara, Angrabhasa–II and Luksan.
 Kranti (community development block) consists of six gram panchayats, viz. Lataguri, Rajadanga, Changmari, Kranti, Moulani and Chipadanga.

Education
Given in the table below (data in numbers) is a comprehensive picture of the education scenario in Jalpaguri district, with data for the year 2013-14.

Note: Primary schools include junior basic schools; middle schools, high schools and higher secondary schools include madrasahs; technical schools include junior technical schools, junior government polytechnics, industrial technical institutes, industrial training centres, nursing training institutes etc.; technical and professional colleges include engineering colleges, medical colleges, para-medical institutes, management colleges, teachers training and nursing training colleges, law colleges, art colleges, music colleges etc. Special and non-formal education centres include sishu siksha kendras, madhyamik siksha kendras, centres of Rabindra mukta vidyalaya, recognised Sanskrit tols, institutions for the blind and other handicapped persons, Anganwadi centres, reformatory schools etc.

Educational institutions
The following institution is located in the Malbazar subdivision:
Parimal Mitra Smriti Mahavidyalaya was established at Malbazar in 1985. Affiliated with the University of North Bengal, it offers courses in arts and commerce.

Healthcare
The table below (all data in numbers) presents an overview of the medical facilities available and patients treated in the hospitals, health centres and sub-centres in Jalpaiguri district, with data for the year 2014:

.* Excluding nursing homes.

Medical facilities
Medical facilities in the Malbazar subdivision are as follows:

Hospitals: (Name, location, beds) 
Mal Subdivisional Hospital, Malbazar, 100 beds

Rural Hospitals: (Name, CD block, location, beds) 
Sulkapara Rural Hospital, Nagrakata CD block, Sulkapara, 30 beds

Block Primary Health Centres: (Name, CD block, location, beds)
Mangalbari Block Primary Health Centre, Matiali CD block, PO  Chalsa, 15 beds
Odlabari Block Primary Health Centre, Mal CD block, Odlabari, PO Panbari, 10 beds

Primary Health Centres : (CD block-wise)(CD block, PHC location, beds)
Matiali CD block: Indong Metali (6), Mathachulka (10).
Nagrakata CD block: Lookshan (4), Dhumpara (PO Nathna) (10).
Mal CD block: Chak Moulani (PO Lataguri) (6), Uttar Saripukhari (PO Krantihat) (4), Dakshin Hanskhali (6).

Legislative segments
As per order of the Delimitation Commission in respect of the delimitation of constituencies in the West Bengal, the Malbazar municipality the Mal block will constitute the Mal assembly constituency of West Bengal. The Metiali block and the Nagrakata block will be part of the Nagrakata assembly constituency. Both the constituencies will be reserved for Scheduled Tribes (ST) candidates. Mal constituency will be part of Jalpaiguri (Lok Sabha constituency), which will be reserved for Scheduled Castes (SC) candidates. Nagrakata constituency will be part of Alipurduars (Lok Sabha constituency), which will be reserved for ST candidates.

References

Subdivisions of West Bengal
Subdivisions in Jalpaiguri district
Jalpaiguri district